Winter Pays For Summer is an album released in 2005 by Glen Phillips. The album was Phillips' debut for Lost Highway/Universal Records. It was recorded during 2003 and 2004. It was produced by John Fields at Paramount Studios and Mansfield Lodge, and features guest appearances by Jon Brion, Sam Phillips, Ben Folds, Andy Sturmer, Kristin Mooney, and Jonathan Foreman. The album boasts a well-produced, radio-ready sheen unheard since Phillips' days with Toad the Wet Sprocket.

It includes the debut single "Thankful", which was Phillips' first radio release for a major label since Toad the Wet Sprocket's 1997 release Coil. However, the song was pulled from radio following a slow start and "Duck And Cover" was pushed to stations as the album's first single.

After being in stores only a few months Lost Highway dropped promotion for the album mid-tour and Glen Phillips asked to be let out of his record deal to create the quiet, and less radio-geared "Mr. Lemons".

Track listing
All songs written by Glen Phillips, except where noted otherwise.
 "Duck and Cover" – 3:23
 "Thankful" – 2:59
 "Courage" – 3:30
 "Released" (Phillips, Dan Wilson) – 4:04
 "Cleareyed" (Phillips, Wilson) – 3:59
 "Falling" – 3:15
 "Half-Life" – 4:14
 "True" (Phillips, Wilson) – 3:14
 "Easier" – 3:18
 "Finally Fading" – 3:27
 "Simple" – 4:05
 "Gather" – 3:10
 "Don't Need Anything" – 2:35

References

Glen Phillips albums
2005 albums
Albums produced by John Fields (record producer)
Lost Highway Records albums